is a Japanese manga series written and illustrated by Kazuhiro Fujita. It was serialized in Shogakukan's seinen manga magazine Big Comic Spirits from 2006 to 2007, with the chapters collected in a single tankōbon volume.

Publication
Jagan wa Gachirin ni Tobu is written and illustrated by Kazuhiro Fujita. It was serialized in Shogakukan's Big Comic Spirits from 2006 to 2007. Shogakukan collected the chapters in a single tankōbon volume, released on April 27, 2007.

The manga was licensed in Italy by J-Pop.

Chapter list

Reception
The manga was nominated for the Seiun Award in the Best Comic category at the 47th Japan Science Fiction Convention in 2008.

References

Action anime and manga
Seinen manga
Shogakukan manga
Thriller anime and manga